The 2012  Women's Premier League was the eleventh season of the Scottish Women's Premier League, the highest division of women's football in Scotland since the SWPL's inception in 2002.

A total of twelve teams contested the league. Aberdeen FC Ladies won the 2011 Scottish Women's First Division and returned to the Premier League after one season away. First Division runners-up Hibernian 2000 were unable to be promoted, as league rules stipulated each club could field only one team in the Premier League. Because the third-placed side in the First Division, Toryglen Ladies, folded over the close season, FC Kilmarnock Ladies were spared relegation and competed in 2012.

New format
The SWPL ran in a new format from this season, with a split division. The 12 clubs faced each other once (11 games per club), after which the league split into top-six and bottom-six sections, based on league position. Each club then played home and away against clubs in their respective sections to give a total of 21 games.

Teams

Stadia and locations

The most regular home ground is shown though some clubs play matches at other venues throughout the season.

League standings

Results

Matches 1–11
Clubs play each other once.

Matches 12–21
After 11 matches, the league splits into top six and bottom six sections. Clubs will play every other club in their section twice (home and away).

Top six

Bottom six

Forfar Farmington's awarded 3–0 win over Glasgow City was the champion club's first League defeat since 2008–09.

Top scorers

1 9 goals for Rangers, 2 goals for Glasgow City.

References

External links
Season on soccerway.com

1
2012 domestic association football leagues
Scottish Women's Premier League seasons